Engine Company No. 10, is a public artwork by artist Michael Casper, commissioned by Thomas M. Wamser  located in the Historic Third Ward on Broadway Street, in Milwaukee, Wisconsin, United States. The structure is made out of bronze and was installed in 1990.

Description
Engine Company No. 10 is a statue of a firefighter sitting on a bench with his dog. The statue shows a firefighter and his dog at rest.  It sits in front the historic Fire Dept. Engine Co. #10 on Broadway Street in the Historic Third Ward, Milwaukee. The Third Ward is an arts district in Milwaukee that contains a theater and many galleries. Each month a gallery night is held to showcase all of the Third Ward's artistic qualities.

References

External links

The Historic Third Ward Website

1990 establishments in Wisconsin
1990 sculptures
Bronze sculptures in Wisconsin
Outdoor sculptures in Milwaukee
Sculptures of dogs in the United States
Sculptures of men in Wisconsin
Statues in Wisconsin